Daines Barrington, FRS, FSA (1727/2814 March 1800) was an English lawyer, antiquary and naturalist. He was one of the correspondents to whom Gilbert White wrote extensively on natural history topics. Barrington served as a Vice President of the Royal Society and wrote on a range of topics related to the natural sciences including early ideas and scientific experimentation on the learning of songs by young birds. He designed a standard format for the collection of information about weather, the flowering of plants, the singing of birds and other annual changes that was also used by Gilbert White. He also wrote on child geniuses including Mozart, who at the age of nine had visited England.

Early life and legal career
Barrington was the fourth son of John Barrington, 1st Viscount Barrington. He matriculated at The Queen's College, Oxford, in 1745, but never graduated. In the same year he was admitted to the Inner Temple, and was called to the bar in 1750.

He subsequently held various legal offices, including marshal of the High Court of Admiralty, 1751–3; a judge of Great Sessions for North Wales (Anglesey, Caernarfonshire and Merionethshire) from 1757; Recorder of Bristol and King's Counsel from 1764; and second justice of Chester from 1778. Though considered by some (including Jeremy Bentham) to be an indifferent judge, his Observations on the Statutes, chiefly the more ancient, from Magna Charta to 21st James I (1766), had a high reputation among historians and constitutional antiquaries, and ran through five editions down to 1796. He resigned all his legal offices in 1785, retaining only that of Commissary General of the stores at Gibraltar, which continued to provide him with a substantial income until his death.

Antiquarian and scientific writings

In 1773 Barrington published an edition of Orosius, with King Alfred's Saxon version, and an English translation with original notes. His Tracts on the Probability of reaching the North Pole (1775) were written in consequence of the northern voyage of discovery undertaken by Captain Constantine John Phipps, afterwards Lord Mulgrave (1744–1792).

Barrington's other writings are chiefly to be found in the publications of the Royal Society and the Society of Antiquaries: he was elected to both bodies in 1767, and afterwards became a vice-president of the latter. Many of these papers were collected by him in a quarto volume entitled Miscellanies on various Subjects (1781). He contributed to the Royal Society's Philosophical Transactions for 1770, an account of Mozart's visit at nine years of age to London. In his Miscellanies on varied subjects he included this with accounts of four other prodigies, namely, William Crotch, Charles and Samuel Wesley, and Garret Wesley, 1st Earl of Mornington. Among his works are studies on Experiments and Observations on the Singing of Birds and an essay on the language of birds. Barrington attempted cross-fostering experiments on birds and noted that young linnets raised with foster parents could be induced to learn the songs of various lark species. He however dismissed the idea of long-distance migration in birds, and supported the ancient view that swallows went to sleep underwater during winter.

Letters to Barrington from the parson-naturalist Gilbert White form a large part of White's 1789 book The Natural History and Antiquities of Selborne; Barrington's half of the correspondence is not included. Barrington established the format of the Naturalist's Journal for "keeping a daily register of observations on the weather, plants, birds, insects, &c" based on Benjamin Stillingfleet for collating information from across England. This format printed by Gilbert White's brother Benjamin was used from around 1769 to serve the study of the natural history of Selbourne. Very few of his log books are extant but Barrington has been considered as a pioneer of the study of phenology.

Barrington met the Cornish speaker Dolly Pentreath and published a report of the encounter. This report is the main source for the claim that Dolly was the last speaker of the Cornish language. A year after Dolly Pentreath died in 1777, Barrington received a letter, written in Cornish and accompanied by an English translation, from a fisherman in Mousehole named William Bodinar stating that he knew of five people who could speak Cornish in that village alone. Barrington also speaks of a John Nancarrow from Marazion who was a native speaker and survived into the 1790s.

The plant genus Barringtonia is named in his honour.

Death and burial
Barrington never married, and lived for most of his life in chambers in King's Bench Walk in the Inner Temple, London. He was afflicted by paralysis from his legs upward and died after being bedridden for a long time on 14 March 1800, and his remains were interred into the vault of the Temple Church.

Notable works

References

External links
 

1728 births
1800 deaths
English antiquarians
18th-century antiquarians
English naturalists
English legal writers
Alumni of The Queen's College, Oxford
Members of the Inner Temple
Fellows of the Royal Society
Fellows of the Society of Antiquaries of London
Younger sons of viscounts